They Were Twelve Women (French: Elles étaient douze femmes) is a 1940 French comedy film directed by Georges Lacombe and starring Gaby Morlay, Françoise Rosay and Micheline Presle.

The film's sets were designed by the art director André Andrejew.

Cast
 Gaby Morlay as Madame Marion  
 Françoise Rosay as La duchesse de Vimeuse  
 Micheline Presle as Lucie  
 Betty Stockfeld as La princesse Kadikoff 
 Simone Berriau as Madame Bernier  
 Nina Myral as La bonne  
 Simone Renant as Gaby  
 Marion Delbo as Madame de Bélières  
 Mila Parély as Madame de Vitrac  
 Primerose Perret as Janine de Vimeuse 
 Pamela Stirling as Madame de Turgis 
 Blanchette Brunoy as Geneviève

References

Bibliography 
 Dayna Oscherwitz & MaryEllen Higgins. The A to Z of French Cinema. Scarecrow Press, 2009.

External links 
 

1940 films
1940 comedy films
French comedy films
1940s French-language films
Films directed by Georges Lacombe
French black-and-white films
1940s French films